Juan Carlos Ferrero was the defending champion but lost in the second round to David Nalbandian.

Nalbandian won in the final 6–4, 7–6(7–5) against Jarkko Nieminen.

Seeds

  Juan Carlos Ferrero (second round)
  Marat Safin (quarterfinals)
  Carlos Moyá (semifinals)
  Albert Costa (first round)
  Sjeng Schalken (quarterfinals)
  Xavier Malisse (first round)
  Félix Mantilla (first round)
  Alberto Martín (first round)

Draw

Finals

Top half

Bottom half

External links
 2002 Estoril Open draw

2002 Men's Singles
Singles
Estoril Open